Crittenden is an unincorporated community in the independent city of Suffolk, Virginia, United States. It is located along U.S. Route 17 just south of its crossing of Chuckatuck Creek.

References

Suffolk, Virginia communities